Borden Lake is a lake in Crow Wing County, in the U.S. state of Minnesota.

Borden Lake was named for David S. Borden, an early settler.

See also
List of lakes in Minnesota

References

Lakes of Minnesota
Lakes of Crow Wing County, Minnesota